Pasikhan (also Romanized as Pasīkhān) is a village in Pasikhan Rural District, in the Central District of Rasht County, Gilan Province, Iran. At the 2006 census, its population was 609, in 137 families.

References 

Populated places in Rasht County